Shawfikul Ghaani Swapan was a Bangladeshi politician and the former chairman of Bangladesh National Awami Party-Bangladesh NAP. During his political career, he served as a Member of Parliament twice, and held cabinet positions in both the Zia and Ershad Governments. His positions included serving as the State Minister of Defence, State Minister of Youth and Sports, Minister of Civil Aviation and Tourism, and Minister of Housing and Public Works.

Early life
Swapan was born on the 11th of September, 1948 in Nilphamari Sadar, Nilphamari District. He was the eldest son of  former Senior Minister Mashiur Rahman, also known as, Jadu Mia. He studied at Notre Dame College in Dhaka and later attended Queen Mary, University of London for his higher studies, going on to graduate in 1968. He was married to Nazhat Ghani Shabnam.

Career

In 1979, on the 10th of May, he won the by-election in Rangpur-1 (the current Nilphamari-1 constituency) as the candidate of the Bangladesh Nationalist Party, after the seat was left vacant due to the passing of his father, Mashiur Rahman. On January 1, 1986, when the Jatiya Party (E) was formed, he was a founding member and made the Organizing Secretary of the party. Later that year, during the general election, he ran in both the Rangpur-3 and Nilphamari-1 constituencies as the Jatiya Party (E) candidate, going on to win both seats. Consequently, in line with the constitution, he surrendered the Nilphamari-1 seat (triggering a by-election in the constituency) and went on to represent Rangpur Sadar (Rangpur-3) in parliament, once again becoming a Member of Parliament.

From the mid to late 1980s, Swapan served as a Cabinet Member of President Ershad's Jatiya Party (E) government, holding many different portfolios. Throughout this period, he was made responsible for the Ministry of Youth and Sports (1984-1985), Ministry of Civil Aviation and Tourism (1985-1986), and the Ministry of Housing and Public Works (1986-1988). During this time, he also briefly served as the State Minister of Defence.

In December 2006, he revived the Bhashani branch of the National Awami Party (NAP) as Bangladesh National Awami Party-Bangladesh NAP, the party had been dissolved in the late 70s after his father, Mashiur Rahman, joined the Nationalist Front (later BNP) with a large portion of the party. Swapan led the party as its chairman until his death. After his death, his eldest son, Jebel Rahman Ghaani, was elected the chairman of the party.

Death
Swapan passed away on the 23rd of August, 2009 in a hospital in Dhaka, Bangladesh. His janaza (funeral prayer) was held at the South Plaza of the Jatiya Sangsad Bhaban (National Parliament House) after which he was taken to his ancestral home in Dimla, Nilphamari where another janaza was held before he was finally laid to rest at his family graveyard in Dimla.

References

National Awami Party politicians
Housing and Public Works ministers of Bangladesh
Civil Aviation and Tourism ministers of Bangladesh
Youth and Sports ministers of Bangladesh
People from Nilphamari District
2nd Jatiya Sangsad members
3rd Jatiya Sangsad members
2009 deaths
1948 births